Crompton-Shenandoah Plant, also known as The Mill at South River, is a historic textile factory complex located at Waynesboro, Virginia. The complex includes 11 contributing buildings and 8 contributing structures involved in the dyeing and finishing of the gray corduroy and velveteen goods. The historic buildings and structures were built beginning in 1926 through 1948.  The complex includes two plant buildings, a machine shop/supply storage building, a former enameling plant, a boiler house, a water softener building, a chemical storage building, a lab, a gate house/personnel office, an office building and a retail store. The factory closed in the 1980s along with most Crompton Corporation plants.

It was added to the National Register of Historic Places in 2011.

See also 
 Crompton Loom Works
 Crompton Mill Historic District

References

Industrial buildings and structures on the National Register of Historic Places in Virginia
Industrial buildings completed in 1926
Buildings and structures in Waynesboro, Virginia
National Register of Historic Places in Waynesboro, Virginia
Textile mills in Virginia
Chemtura
Dyes